North American Baptists (NAB) is an association of Baptists in the United States and Canada, generally of German ethnic heritage with roots in Pietism.

History
The roots of the NAB go back to 1839, when Konrad Anton Fleischmann began work in New Jersey and Pennsylvania with German immigrants. Fleischmann was a Swiss separatist and held to believer's baptism and regenerate church membership. In 1843, the first German Baptist Church was organized in the city of Philadelphia, Pennsylvania. This was the oldest church affiliated with the North American Baptist Conference. German Baptist Churches were organized in Illinois, Missouri, New York, Ontario, and Wisconsin in the 1840s and early 1850s. The churches organized a conference in 1851 in Philadelphia, named the "Conference of Ministers and Helpers of German Churches of Baptized Christians, usually called Baptists." Another conference was formed in 1859 in Springfield, Illinois. The first German Baptist church in Canada was established by August Rauschenbusch in Ontario in 1851. The General Conference of German Baptist Churches in North America was formed in 1865 at Wilmot, Ontario, and meets every three years for fellowship and to conduct business. The Conference has changed from originally being German-language churches to primarily using the English language. The Conference adopted its present title in 1944, removing the reference to its ethnic identity. In 1970 the form of organization of the North American Baptist Conference was restructured into 21 (now 20) smaller units called "Associations."

The General Council, composed of representatives from the 20 associations and affiliated organizations, is the "governing" body of the Conference. The North American Baptist Conference has two schools - the Sioux Falls Seminary in Sioux Falls, South Dakota in the United States and Taylor Seminary in Edmonton, Alberta in Canada. The Conference's Headquarters are located in Roseville, California. About 65 missionaries (partially or fully supported) serve in 7 foreign countries. Approximately 70% of the member churches are in the U.S. and 30% in Canada. The NABC had 64,565 members in 444 churches in the United States and Canada in 2002 (137 churches with 16,859 members in Canada and 307 churches with 47,706 members in the U.S.).

See also
Baptists in Canada

References

External links
North American Baptist Conference - official Web Site
 - PDF 2002 NABC Membership Summary
Official Archives - North American Baptist Archives
Sioux Falls Seminary - Official Seminary Page
Taylor College and Seminary
Profile of the North American Baptist Conference on the Association of Religion Data Archives website

Sources
Baptists Around the World, by Albert W. Wardin, Jr.
Dictionary of Baptists in America, Bill J. Leonard, editor
Handbook of Denominations, by Frank Mead, Samuel Hill, and Craig Atwood
Religious Congregations & Membership in the United States, 2000, Glenmary Research Center
The Baptist Heritage: Four Centuries of Baptist Witness, by H. Leon McBeth

Religious organizations established in 1865
Members of the National Association of Evangelicals
Baptist denominations in the United States